The Navy Midshipmen men's basketball team represents the United States Naval Academy, in Annapolis, Maryland, in NCAA Division I college basketball. The team competes in the Patriot League and plays its home games in Alumni Hall.

The U.S. Naval Academy began varsity intercollegiate competition in men's basketball in the 1907–08 season. Navy was retroactively recognized as the pre-NCAA tournament national champion for the 1912–13 and 1918–19 seasons by the Premo-Porretta Power Poll and for the 1912–13 season by the Helms Athletic Foundation.

Postseason history

NCAA tournament results
The Midshipmen have appeared in the NCAA tournament 11 times and made regional finals (the "Elite Eight") in 1947, 1954 and 1986. Their overall tournament record is 8–11.

NIT results
The Midshipmen have appeared in one National Invitation Tournament. Their record is 0–1.

Conference tournament championships

Patriot League tournament
See: Patriot League men's basketball tournament
1994: tournament champion (tournament MVP: T.J. Hall)
1997: tournament champion (tournament MVP: Hassan Booker)
1998: tournament champion (tournament MVP: Skip Victor)

Colonial Athletic Association tournament
See: Colonial Athletic Association#History of the Tournament Final
1985: tournament champion (tournament MVP: Vernon Butler)
1986: tournament champion (tournament MVP: David Robinson)
1987: tournament champion (tournament MVP: David Robinson)

Awards and honors

Colonial Athletic Association Men's Basketball Player of the Year
1984–85 – David Robinson
1985–86 – David Robinson
1986–87 – David Robinson

Patriot League Men's Basketball Player of the Year
2007–08 – Greg Sprink

Athletic Hall of Fame
For basketball players in the USNA Athletic Hall of Fame, see footnote

The Athletic Hall of Fame is housed in Lejeune Hall. Among the exhibits is the Eastman Award won by David Robinson in 1987.

Notable players

Laurence Wild (1913) – Later head coach of the team, and the 30th Governor of American Samoa.
Brian Gregory (1985–86) – head men's basketball coach at South Florida
Cliff Rees (1984–88) – over 1,100 career points at the Naval Academy and teammate of David Robinson.
David Robinson (1983–87) – two-time NBA champion and a 2009 inductee into the Basketball Hall of Fame; the CAA's all-time points leader (2,669); won college basketball's two most prestigious player awards, the Naismith and Wooden awards
Doug Wojcik (1982–86) – a teammate of David Robinson; former head coach at the College of Charleston and Tulsa University.

References

External links